The 1986–87 Vancouver Canucks season was the team's 17th in the National Hockey League (NHL).

Offseason

Regular season

Final standings

Schedule and results

Playoffs

Player statistics

Awards and records

Transactions

Draft picks
Vancouver's draft picks at the 1986 NHL Entry Draft held at the Montreal Forum in Montreal, Quebec.

Farm teams

See also
1986–87 NHL season

References

External links

Vancouver Canucks seasons
Vancouver C
Vancouver